Obscurantism or obscurationism is philosophical term that describes the anti-intellectual practices of deliberately presenting information in an abstruse and imprecise manner that limits further inquiry and understanding of a subject. There are two historical and intellectual denotations of obscurantism: (1) the deliberate restriction of knowledge—opposition to the dissemination of knowledge; and (2) deliberate obscurity—a recondite style of writing characterized by deliberate vagueness.

The term obscurantism derives from the title of the 16th-century satire  (Letters of Obscure Men, 1515–1519), which was based upon the intellectual dispute between the German Catholic humanist Johann Reuchlin and the monk Johannes Pfefferkorn of the Dominican Order, about whether or not all Jewish books should be burned as un-Christian heresy.  Earlier, in 1509, the monk Pfefferkorn had obtained permission from Maximilian I, Holy Roman Emperor (1486–1519), to burn all copies of the Talmud (Jewish law and Jewish ethics) known to be in the Holy Roman Empire (AD 926–1806); the Letters of Obscure Men satirized the Dominican arguments for burning un-Christian works.

In the 18th century, Enlightenment philosophers applied the term obscurantist to any enemy of intellectual enlightenment and the liberal diffusion of knowledge. In the 19th century, in distinguishing the varieties of obscurantism found in metaphysics and theology from the "more subtle" obscurantism of the critical philosophy of Immanuel Kant, and of modern philosophical skepticism, Friedrich Nietzsche said: "The essential element in the black art of obscurantism is not that it wants to darken individual understanding, but that it wants to blacken our picture of the world, and darken our idea of existence."

Restricting knowledge 

In restricting knowledge to an élite ruling class of "the few", obscurantism is fundamentally anti-democratic, because its component anti-intellectualism and elitism exclude the people as intellectually unworthy of knowing the facts and truth about the government of their city-state.

In 18th century monarchic France, the Marquis de Condorcet, as a political scientist, documented the aristocracy's obscurantism about the social problems that provoked the French Revolution (1789–1799) that deposed them and their king, Louis XVI of France.

In the 19th century, the mathematician William Kingdon Clifford, an early proponent of Darwinism, devoted some writings to uprooting obscurantism in England, after hearing clerics—who privately agreed with him about evolution—publicly denounce evolution as un-Christian. Moreover, in the realm of organized religion, obscurantism is a distinct strain of thought independent of theologic allegiance. The distinction is that fundamentalism presupposes sincere religious belief, whereas obscurantism is based upon minority manipulation of the popular faith as political praxis; cf. Censorship.

Leo Strauss

Political philosophy 
In the 20th century, the American conservative political philosopher Leo Strauss, for whom philosophy and politics intertwined, and his neo-conservative adherents adopted the notion of government by the enlightened few as political strategy. He noted that intellectuals, dating from Plato, confronted the dilemma of either an informed populace "interfering" with government, or whether it were possible for good politicians to be truthful and still govern to maintain a stable society—hence the noble lie necessary in securing public acquiescence. In The City and Man (1964), he discusses the myths in The Republic that Plato proposes effective governing requires, among them, the belief that the country (land) ruled by the state belongs to it (despite some having been conquered from others), and that citizenship derives from more than the accident of birth in the city-state. Thus, in the New Yorker magazine article "Selective Intelligence", Seymour Hersh observes that Strauss endorsed the "noble lie" concept: the myths politicians use in maintaining a cohesive society.

Shadia Drury criticized Strauss's acceptance of dissembling and deception of the populace as "the peculiar justice of the wise", whereas Plato proposed the noble lie as based upon moral good. In criticizing Natural Right and History (1953), she said that "Strauss thinks that the superiority of the ruling philosophers is an intellectual superiority and not a moral one ... [he] is the only interpreter who gives a sinister reading to Plato, and then celebrates him."

Esoteric texts 
Leo Strauss also was criticized for proposing the notion of "esoteric" meanings to ancient texts, obscure knowledge inaccessible to the "ordinary" intellect. In Persecution and the Art of Writing (1952), he proposes that some philosophers write esoterically to avert persecution by the political or religious authorities, and, per his knowledge of Maimonides, Al Farabi, and Plato, proposed that an esoteric writing style is proper for the philosophic text. Rather than explicitly presenting his thoughts, the philosopher's esoteric writing compels the reader to think independently of the text, and so learn. Strauss noted that one of writing's political dangers is students' too-readily accepting dangerous ideas—as in the trial of Socrates, wherein the relationship with Alcibiades was used to prosecute him.

For Leo Strauss, philosophers' texts offered the reader lucid "exoteric" (salutary) and obscure "esoteric" (true) teachings, which are concealed to the reader of ordinary intellect; emphasizing that writers often left contradictions and other errors to encourage the reader's more scrupulous (re-)reading of the text. In observing and maintaining the "exoteric—esoteric" dichotomy, Strauss was accused of obscurantism, and for writing esoterically.

Bill Joy 

In the Wired magazine article "Why the Future Doesn't Need Us" (April 2000), the computer scientist Bill Joy, then a Sun Microsystems chief scientist, in the sub-title proposed that: "Our most powerful twenty-first-century technologies—robotics, genetic engineering, and nanotech[nology]—are threatening to make humans an endangered species"; in the body, he posits that:

Joy's proposal for limiting the dissemination of "certain" knowledge, in behalf of preserving society, was quickly likened to obscurantism. A year later, the American Association for the Advancement of Science, in the Science and Technology Policy Yearbook 2001, published the article "A Response to Bill Joy and the Doom-and-Gloom Technofuturists", wherein the computer scientists John Seely Brown and Paul Duguid countered his proposal as technological tunnel vision, and the predicted technologically derived problems as infeasible, for disregarding the influence of non-scientists upon such societal problems.

Appeal to emotion 

In the essay "Why I Am Not a Conservative" (1960), the economist Friedrich von Hayek said that political conservatism is ideologically unrealistic, because of the conservative person's inability to adapt to changing human realities and refusal to offer a positive political program that benefits everyone in a society. In that context, Hayek used the term obscurantism differently, to denote and describe the denial of the empirical truth of scientific theory, because of the disagreeable moral consequences that might arise from acceptance of fact.

Deliberate obscurity 
The second sense of obscurantism denotes making knowledge abstruse, that is, difficult to grasp. In the 19th and 20th centuries obscurantism became a polemical term for accusing an author of deliberately writing obscurely, in order to hide his or her intellectual vacuousness. Philosophers who are neither empiricists nor positivists often are considered obscurantists when describing the abstract concepts of their disciplines. For philosophic reasons, such authors might modify or reject verifiability, falsifiability, and logical non-contradiction. From that perspective, obscure (clouded, vague, abstruse) writing does not necessarily indicate that the writer has a poor grasp of the subject, because unintelligible writing sometimes is purposeful and philosophically considered.

Aristotle 

Aristotle divided his own works into two classifications: "exoteric" and "esoteric". Most scholars have understood this as a distinction of intended audience, where exoteric works were written for the public, and the esoteric works were more technical works intended for use within the Lyceum. Modern scholars commonly assume these latter to be Aristotle's own (unpolished) lecture notes or, in some cases, possible notes by his students. However, the 5th-century neoplatonist Ammonius Hermiae writes that Aristotle's writing style is deliberately obscurantist so that "good people may for that reason stretch their mind even more, whereas empty minds that are lost through carelessness will be put to flight by the obscurity when they encounter sentences like these".

In contemporary discussions of virtue ethics, Aristotle's Nicomachean Ethics (The Ethics) stands accused of ethical obscurantism, because of the technical, philosophic language and writing style, and their purpose being the education of a cultured governing elite.

Kant 
Immanuel Kant employed technical terms that were not commonly understood by the layman. Arthur Schopenhauer contended that post-Kantian philosophers such as Johann Gottlieb Fichte, Friedrich Wilhelm Joseph Schelling, and Georg Wilhelm Friedrich Hegel deliberately imitated the abstruse style of writing practiced by Kant.

Hegel 

G. W. F. Hegel's philosophy, and the philosophies of those he influenced, especially Karl Marx, have been accused of obscurantism. Analytic and positivistic philosophers, such as A. J. Ayer, Bertrand Russell, and the critical-rationalist Karl Popper, accused Hegel and Hegelianism of being obscure. About Hegel's philosophy, Schopenhauer wrote that it is "a colossal piece of mystification, which will yet provide posterity with an inexhaustible theme for laughter at our times, that it is a pseudo-philosophy paralyzing all mental powers, stifling all real thinking, and, by the most outrageous misuse of language, putting in its place the hollowest, most senseless, thoughtless, and, as is confirmed by its success, most stupefying verbiage".

Nevertheless, biographer Terry Pinkard notes: "Hegel has refused to go away, even in analytic philosophy, itself." Hegel was aware of his obscurantism and perceived it as part of philosophical thinking: to accept and transcend the limitations of quotidian (everyday) thought and its concepts. In the essay "Who Thinks Abstractly?", he said that it is not the philosopher who thinks abstractly, but the layman, who uses concepts as givens that are immutable, without context. It is the philosopher who thinks concretely, because he transcends the limits of quotidian concepts, in order to understand their broader context. This makes philosophical thought and language appear obscure, esoteric, and mysterious to the layman.

Marx 

In his early works, Karl Marx criticized German and French philosophy, especially German Idealism, for its traditions of German irrationalism and ideologically motivated obscurantism. Later thinkers whom he influenced, such as the philosopher György Lukács and social theorist Jürgen Habermas, followed with similar arguments of their own. However, philosophers such as Karl Popper and Friedrich Hayek in turn criticized Marx and Marxist philosophy as obscurantist (however, see above for Hayek's particular interpretation of the term).

Heidegger 
Martin Heidegger, and those influenced by him, such as Jacques Derrida and Emmanuel Levinas, have been labeled obscurantists by critics from analytic philosophy and the Frankfurt School of critical theory. Of Heidegger, Bertrand Russell wrote: "his philosophy is extremely obscure. One cannot help suspecting that language is here running riot. An interesting point in his speculations is the insistence that nothingness is something positive. As with much else in Existentialism, this is a psychological observation made to pass for logic." That is Russell's complete entry on Heidegger, and it expresses the sentiments of many 20th-century analytic philosophers concerning Heidegger.

Derrida 
In their obituaries "Jacques Derrida, Abstruse Theorist, Dies at 74" (10 October 2004) and "Obituary of Jacques Derrida, French intellectual" (21 October 2004), The New York Times newspaper and The Economist magazine described Derrida as a deliberately obscure philosopher.

In Contingency, Irony, and Solidarity (1989), Richard Rorty proposed that in The Post Card: From Socrates to Freud and Beyond (1978), Jacques Derrida purposefully used undefinable words (e.g. différance) and used defined words in contexts so diverse that they render the words unintelligible, hence, the reader is unable to establish a context for his literary self. In that way, the philosopher Derrida escapes metaphysical accounts of his work. Since the work ostensibly contains no metaphysics, Derrida has, consequently, escaped metaphysics.

Derrida's philosophic work is especially controversial among American and British academics, as when the University of Cambridge awarded him an honorary doctorate, despite opposition from among the Cambridge philosophy faculty and analytical philosophers worldwide. In opposing the decision, philosophers including Barry Smith, W. V. O. Quine, David Armstrong, Ruth Barcan Marcus, René Thom, and twelve others, published a letter of protestation in The Times of London, arguing that "his works employ a written style that defies comprehension ... [thus] Academic status based on what seems to us to be little more than semi-intelligible attacks upon the values of reason, truth, and scholarship is not, we submit, sufficient grounds for the awarding of an honorary degree in a distinguished university."

In the New York Review of Books article "An Exchange on Deconstruction" (February 1984), John Searle comments on Deconstruction: "anyone who reads deconstructive texts with an open mind is likely to be struck by the same phenomena that initially surprised me: the low level of philosophical argumentation, the deliberate obscurantism of the prose, the wildly exaggerated claims, and the constant striving to give the appearance of profundity, by making claims that seem paradoxical, but under analysis often turn out to be silly or trivial".

Lacan 
Jacques Lacan was an intellectual who defended obscurantism to a degree. To his students' complaint about the deliberate obscurity of his lectures, he replied: "The less you understand, the better you listen." In the 1973 seminar Encore, he said that his  (Writings) were not to be understood, but would effect a meaning in the reader, like that induced by mystical texts. The obscurity is not in his writing style, but in the repeated allusions to Hegel, derived from Alexandre Kojève's lectures on Hegel, and similar theoretic divergences.

Sokal affair 
The Sokal affair (1996) was a publishing hoax that the professor of physics Alan Sokal perpetrated on the editors and readers of Social Text, an academic journal of post-modern cultural studies that was not then a peer-reviewed publication. In 1996, as an experiment testing editorial integrity (fact-checking, verification, peer review, etc.), Sokal submitted "Transgressing the Boundaries: Towards a Transformative Hermeneutics of Quantum Gravity", a pseudoscientific article proposing that physical reality is a social construct, in order to learn whether Social Text would "publish an article liberally salted with nonsense if: (a) it sounded good, and, (b) it flattered the editors' ideological preconceptions". Sokal's fake article was published in the spring/summer 1996 issue of Social Text, which was dedicated to the science wars about the conceptual validity of scientific objectivity and the nature of scientific theory, among scientific realists and postmodern critics in American universities.

Sokal's reason for publication of a false article was that postmodernist critics questioned the objectivity of science, by criticising the scientific method and the nature of knowledge, usually in the disciplines of cultural studies, cultural anthropology, feminist studies, comparative literature, media studies, and science and technology studies. Whereas the scientific realists countered that objective scientific knowledge exists, riposting that postmodernist critics almost knew nothing of the science they criticized. In the event, editorial deference to "academic authority" (the author-professor) prompted the editors of Social Text not to fact-check Sokal's manuscript by submitting it to peer review by a scientist.

Concerning the lack of editorial integrity shown by the publication of his fake article in Social Text magazine, Sokal addressed the matter in the May 1996 edition of the Lingua Franca journal, in the article "A Physicist Experiments With Cultural Studies", in which he revealed that his transformative hermeneutics article was a parody, submitted "to test the prevailing intellectual standards", and concluded that, as an academic publication, Social Text ignored the requisite intellectual rigor of verification and "felt comfortable publishing an article on quantum physics without bothering to consult anyone knowledgeable in the subject".

Moreover, as a public intellectual, Sokal said that his hoax was an action protesting against the contemporary tendency towards obscurantism—abstruse, esoteric, and vague writing in the social sciences:
In short, my concern over the spread of subjectivist thinking is both intellectual and political. Intellectually, the problem with such doctrines is that they are false (when not simply meaningless). There is a real world; its properties are not merely social constructions; facts and evidence do matter. What sane person would contend otherwise? And yet, much contemporary academic theorizing consists precisely of attempts to blur these obvious truths—the utter absurdity of it all being concealed through obscure and pretentious language.

Moreover, independent of the hoax, as a pseudoscientific opus, the article "Transgressing the Boundaries: Towards a Transformative Hermeneutics of Quantum Gravity" is described as an exemplar "pastiche of left-wing cant, fawning references, grandiose quotations, and outright nonsense, centered on the claim that physical reality is merely a social construct". Similarly to whataboutism, obscurantism is used by elevating the readers prejudices to a grandiose value-laden assumption, belief, principle(s) or pseudoscience that does not deconstruct opposing claims and is stalling a priori and/or asserting confusing jargon or technical speak to describe events, which may deny the real world existence of physical properties.

See also 

 Anti-intellectualism
 Cover-up
 Cult
 Disinformation
 Doublespeak
 Dumbing down
 Fundamentalism
 Greenspeak
 Paternalism
 Paywall
 Perception management
 Philosopher king
 Politicization of science
 Pseudophilosophy
 Pseudointellectual
 Psychological manipulation
 Positivism
 Scientism
 Whataboutism

Notes

References

External links
 
 Obscurantism in religion – Islamic Research Foundation International

Obfuscation
Anti-intellectualism
Knowledge
Philosophical theories
Propaganda techniques